Society of the Snow is an upcoming Spanish disaster drama film directed by J. A. Bayona. The film is an adaptation of the book  (The Snow Society: The Definitive Account of the World's Greatest Survival Story) by Pablo Vierci, which documents accounts of all 16 survivors of the 1972 Andes flight disaster, many of whom Vierci knew from childhood. The cast is composed of Uruguayan and Argentine actors, most of whom are newcomers. Netflix will release the film, which is expected to be ready in 2023.

Cast
The cast is as follows:

Carlos Páez plays his own father.

Production
Bayona discovered Vierci's book while researching for his 2012 film The Impossible. Society of the Snow was announced in November 2021. Filming locations include Sierra Nevada, Spain; Montevideo, Uruguay; and Chile and Argentina in the Andes, including the actual crash site.

Principal photography took place in Sierra Nevada from 10 January to 29 April 2022. In Sierra Nevada, the production was challenged by a scarcity of snow and the Saharan Air Layer, which covered the mountains in orange. In the hangar, a 30-metre-tall screen displayed the second unit's footage of the Andes. A third unit was tasked with more dangerous mountain shots. The three units consisted of around 300 workers. Filming in Uruguay concluded in late July 2022, and the production continued in Madrid.

David Martí and Montse Ribé, Academy Award–winning special effects makeup artists of Pan's Labyrinth, created prosthetic corpses and wounds. Post-production is planned to last about five months involving 300 personnel. Vierci, who serves as an associate producer, visited the set in Sierra Nevada.

See also
 Alive (1993 film)

References

External links
 

Upcoming films
2020s disaster films
2020s drama films
Spanish disaster films
Spanish drama films
2020s survival films
Disaster films based on actual events
Drama films based on actual events
2020s Spanish-language films
Films about aviation accidents or incidents
Films about death
Films based on non-fiction books
Films directed by J. A. Bayona
Films set in 1972
Films set in Chile
Rugby union films
Films about cannibalism
Cultural depictions of Uruguayan men
Cultural depictions of rugby footballers
Films shot in the province of Granada
Films shot in Montevideo
Films shot in Chile
Films shot in Argentina
Uruguayan Air Force Flight 571
Upcoming Netflix original films
Upcoming Spanish-language films